Achlyodes is a genus of skippers. It is monotypic, being represented by the single species Achlyodes busirus.

References

Natural History Museum Lepidoptera genus database

Pyrginae
Hesperiidae of South America
Hesperiidae genera
Taxa named by Jacob Hübner